Hellbound is a 1994 American supernatural thriller film starring Chuck Norris, Calvin Levels and Christopher Neame. It was directed by Aaron Norris and written by Ian Rabin, Anthony Ridio and Brent Friedman. It was the final movie made by Cannon Films.

Plot

Frank Shatter (Chuck Norris) and Calvin Jackson (Calvin Levels) are two Chicago Police detectives sent to investigate the brutal murder of a rabbi. As the investigation begins, Shatter and Jackson are summoned to Israel for questioning. Upon arrival, they realize that they are, in fact, pursuing a supernatural being – Satan's emissary, Prosatanos – who tried to wrest control of the world from God during the crusades. Prosatanos, however, was stopped by King Richard who trapped him in a subterranean tomb. During this encounter with King Richard, the source of Prosatanos' power – his scepter – was shattered into nine pieces which were subsequently sent to nine holy places around the world. These pieces remained safe until the end of the 20th century when Prosatanos was inadvertently freed from the tomb by two unsuspecting grave robbers. Prosatanos eventually collects all nine pieces of his scepter. Detectives Shatter and Jackson must now fight him to save the world.

Cast

 Chuck Norris as Sergeant Frank Shatter
 Calvin Levels as Detective Calvin Jackson
 Christopher Neame as Professor Malcolm Lockley \ Prosatanos
 Sheree J. Wilson as Leslie Hawkins
 David Robb as Richard I of England
 Cherie Franklin as Captain Hull
 Jack Adalist as Reinhard Krieger
 Ezere Atar as Bezi
 Jack Messinger as Mahoney
 Elki Jackobs as Mort
 Nico Nitai as Friar
 Ori Levy as Rabbi Mordechai Shindler
 Tim Grayem as Bonehead
 Yoseph Peled  as Holy Man
 Asher Tzarfati as Captain Arrad

Production

Filming
The film was shot entirely in Israel, between May and August 1992. In particular, the second part of the movie was filmed in Jerusalem.

The film's shooting title was originally Cold to the Touch.

Reception

Critical response
Eoin Friel from "The Action Elite" scored the film two out of five and stated: "Overall, Hellbound is pretty lame, but on a purely guilty pleasure level it’s worth checking out. Just mute it when the sidekick is on screen."

Charles Tatum from "eFilm Critic" gave the film only one star and wrote: "This film is badly written, badly acted, and badly directed. It does not work as action, cop drama, or even horror. It just shows that the now defunct Cannon Studios was willing to throw their money into anything, no matter how badly it was planned."

Motion picture historian Leonard Maltin seemed to agree, giving the film 1.5 out of a possible 4 stars. According to himself, the movie combines "Too much acting from Neame, not enough acting from Norris, and a silly story with little action...That it was released directly to home-video two years after being shot certainly doesn't help."

See also
 List of American films of 1994
 Chuck Norris filmography

References

External links
 

1994 films
American action horror films
American police detective films
Films directed by Aaron Norris
Films scored by George S. Clinton
Golan-Globus films
1990s action horror films
Demons in film
American supernatural horror films
Films shot in Israel
1990s English-language films
1990s American films